The Nokia 7 Plus is a Nokia-branded upper-mid-range smartphone running the Android operating system. It was announced on 25 February 2018, along with four other Nokia-branded phones.

Specifications

Software
As the Nokia 7 Plus is an Android One device, it runs a near-stock version of the Android operating system. It was originally shipped with Android 8.0 Oreo; however, an update to Android 8.1 Oreo was released soon after for the device.

On 8 May 2018, it was announced that the Nokia 7 Plus would be one of seven non-Google smartphones to receive the Android Pie beta. On 28 September 2018, the Android Pie update started to roll out to the Nokia 7 Plus in phases, starting in India, and on 30 November 2018 in China.

On 7 January 2020, Android 10 started being rolled out on the Nokia 7 Plus.

Hardware
The Nokia 7 Plus has a 6.0-inch LTPS IPS LCD display, Octa-core (4x2.2 GHz Kryo 260 & 4x1.8 GHz Kryo 260) Qualcomm Snapdragon 660 processor, 4 GB of RAM and 64 GB of internal storage that can be expanded using microSD cards up to 256 GB. The phone has a 3800 mAh Li-Ion battery, 13 MP rear camera with LED flash and 16 MP front-facing camera with auto-focus. It is available in Tempered Black/Copper, White/Copper colors.
The phone is designed from a single block of 6000 series aluminium.

As with other mid-range and top-range phones from Nokia, the Nokia 7 Plus features exclusive rear camera optics licensed from ZEISS.

The NFC-area on the back of the phone is both smaller and weaker than comparable phones. The NFC area can be found to the left of the camera housing. The development of Nokia 7 plus began as early as 2017 by 31 December of the same year it was ready for release.

Reception
Reviews of the Nokia 7 Plus have been generally positive. Critics have praised its large display, battery life, and Android One software. Its design and build quality have also been praised. One reviewer called it the most promising Nokia smartphone "in years". Android Central praised its camera as being "one of the best" in its $400 price category, and added that the 7 Plus is "one of the best phones of the year". At the same time, the phone's slow camera processing speed was criticised.

Controversies 
In March 2019, a report by Norwegian state broadcaster NRK found that some Nokia 7 Plus phones sent sensitive unencrypted personal information (including location and serial number) to a domain name controlled by China Telecom, every time the device was booted, and multiple times thereafter. HMD responded to the allegations, stating that carrier activation software intended for a different market was accidentally included in a batch of the devices, but that only "activation data" that could not be used to identify a user was sent and not processed, and that this error was fixed by the February 2019 software patch. Finnish authorities are investigating this as a violation of the General Data Protection Regulation (GDPR).

Note

References

External links 
 

7 Plus
Mobile phones introduced in 2018
Mobile phones with multiple rear cameras
Mobile phones with 4K video recording
Discontinued smartphones